The 1960 Notre Dame Fighting Irish football team represented the University of Notre Dame during the 1960 NCAA University Division football season.

Schedule

Personnel

Roster
 QB: George Haffner, Daryle Lamonica, Dan Luecke, Norb Rascher
 HB: Leo Caito, Bill Clark, Angelo Dabiero, Tom Liggio, Red Mack, Frank Minik, Charlie O'Hara, Ray Ratkowski, Ed Rutkowski, Bob Scarpitto, George Sefcik
 FB: Bill Ahern, Frank Gargiulo, Bill Henneghan, Mike Lind, Joe Maxwell, Dick Naab, Joe Perkowski
 E: Brian Boulac, Max Burnell, Jack Cullen, Bill Ford, Steve Kolski, Jim Mikacich, Tom Monohan, Denny Murphy, John Powers, Leo Seiler, Jim Sherlock, Les Traver 
 C: Bill Clements, Tom Hecomovich, Ed Hoerster, John Linehan, Gene Viola
 OG: Charlie Augustine, Nick Buoniconti, Nick DePola, Frank Grau, Jim Loula, Mike Magnotta, Paul Nissi, Myron Pottios, Norb Roy
 OT: Bob Bill, Ed Burke, Joe Carollo, Dan Kolasinski, Bob Koreck, Bob Pietrzak, Roger Wilke, George Williams
 DB: Jack Castin, Clay Schulz

Coaching staff
 Head coach: Joe Kuharich
 Assistants: Bill Daddio (first assistant, ends), Hugh Devore (freshman), Don Doll (backfield), Brad Lynn (assistant backfield), John Murphy (assistant freshman), Dick Stanfel (line)

Team players drafted into the NFL

References

Notre Dame
Notre Dame Fighting Irish football seasons
Notre Dame Fighting Irish football